Judge Graham may refer to:

Donald L. Graham (born 1948), United States federal judge
James Graham Jenkins (1834–1921), United States federal judge
James Graham, 2nd Marquess of Montrose (1631–1669), Scottish nobleman and judge
James Graham, 3rd Duke of Montrose (1755–1836), Lord Justice General of Scotland
James L. Graham (born 1939), United States federal judge
Janis Graham Jack (born 1946), United States federal judge
Mal Graham (born 1945), former basketball player and a judge on the Massachusetts Appeals Court
Peter Graham (judge) (born 1940), retired Justice of the Federal Court of Australia
Robert Graham (judge) (1744–1836), English judge
Samuel C. Graham (1846–1923), Virginia lawyer and judge
Samuel Jordan Graham (1859–1951), judge of the United States Court of Claims
Thomas Graham (barrister) (1860–1940), South African judge
Thomas Graham Robertson, Lord Robertson (1881–1944), 20th-century Scottish advocate, who became a Senator of the College of Justice
Warner A. Graham (1884–1934), Vermont attorney and judge
William Graham, 7th Earl of Menteith (1591–1661), 17th-century Scottish nobleman who held offices including Lord President of the Court of Session
William J. Graham (1872–1937), judge of the United States Court of Customs Appeals

See also
Justice Graham (disambiguation)
Graham (surname)
Graham (disambiguation)